Steve Hyche (born June 12, 1963) is a former American football linebacker. He played for the Chicago Bears  in 1989 and for the Phoenix Cardinals from 1991 to 1993.

References

1963 births
Living people
American football linebackers
West Alabama Tigers football players
Chicago Bears players
Birmingham Fire players
Phoenix Cardinals players